Italian Mountain is a high mountain summit in the Elk Mountains range of the Rocky Mountains of North America. Italian Mountain was so named because the mountain's tones were said to resemble the colors of the Italian tricolor: green, white, and red.

See also

List of Colorado mountain ranges
List of Colorado mountain summits
List of Colorado fourteeners
List of Colorado 4000 meter prominent summits
List of the most prominent summits of Colorado
List of Colorado county high points

References

External links

 

Mountains of Colorado
Mountains of Gunnison County, Colorado
Gunnison National Forest
North American 4000 m summits